The history of the Cinema of Botswana (or cinema in Botswana) comprises film-making in the Southern African country of Botswana, both before and after Botswana's independence. The cinema of Botswana is one of a number of African national cinemas that also includes the national cinemas of Benin, Egypt, Kenya, Nigeria and South Africa, among others.

The local film industry of Botswana has been nicknamed "Botswood" by some, similar to the way the Indian film industry is called "Bollywood", the Nigerian one "Nollywood", and the American one "Hollywood".

Early history
According to historian Neil Parsons, the earliest known surviving copy of a film recorded in Botswana dates back to between 1906 and 1907. According to him, a London, England based company owned by a man named Charlie Urban sent cameramen to record a documentary about the Bechuanaland Railways trip to Victoria Falls, a train trip which passed through territory of what is today's country of Botswana. Ethnographer Rudolf Pöch from Austria then came and made a series of short films in the African country, which incorporated sound and color and featured a sixty-year-old man, Kubi. Parsons considered Kubi the "first Botswana film star".

In 1912, a Londoner known as W. Butcher obtained permission to travel to Eastern Botswana to film a march by the Bangwato regiments; this took place at the city of Serowe. From the time of the First World War and up to the Second World War, Botswana's film industry's productions were dominated by documentaries about local peoples of the Botswana western region and newsreels about things happening at the east.

Reportedly, the first Filmmaker from Botswana was a man named Molefi Pilane, a local, tribal chief who allegedly recorded women bathing by using a small recording camera. A woman known as "Miss Muichison" recorded films totaling about two hours, detailing the operations of the African Auxiliary Pioneers Corps; two parts are known to survive and a third is suspected of existing somewhere in Botswana.

The film named Bechuanaland Protectorate was made during the Second World War and has to do with APC soldiers returning home from North Africa after winning a trip back to Botswana. The film features tribal chief Bathoen II.

Cape Town film-maker Bill Lewis came to Botswana territory in 1947 to film the Royal visit to a farm where APC soldiers had been. American Tom Larson also came during the late 1940s; he filmed two documentaries, one titled "Rainmakers of the Okavango" which was released in 1948.

1950s to 1960s
Local politician, the future first President of Botswana Seretse Khama, a Black man, married Ruth Williams, a White woman from England, in 1948, bringing Botswana international attention because of regional Apartheid laws; this made several film production companies produce movietone reels about the couple. The companies that filmed these features included Paramount Pictures and Universal News. Films about this couple continued being produced well after they had left Botswana to live in exile.

1953 saw the production of "Remmants of a Dying Race", produced by Molepolole resident Louis Knobel, a White man who worked for the South African Information Services. This film detailed lives of the San people living on the Kalahari desert, which includes part of Botswana. It was produced under the "Kalahari Films" company name and lasted 17 minutes.

"The Hunters", a 1957 film production by American John Marshall was also about the people living on the Kalahari, as was the BBC's show, "The Lost World of the Kalahari", featuring South African host Laurens van der Post.

The American show "Mutual of Omaha's Wild Kingdom" also came to film around Botswana several times during the 1960s.

Botswana gained its independence in 1966, bringing political, social and cultural changes to the area, including the way films were produced and developed in the then new African country.

Recent history
In 1980, John Marshall filmed another of his many Botswana-related documentaries, "Nǃai, the Story of a ǃKung Woman", about the struggles of a !Kung woman, N!ai, who was forcibly married at age eight to a tribal healer.

The 1981 comedy, "The Gods Must Be Crazy" was set in Botswana and became a major international hit; it spanned one official and three unofficial sequels:1988's "The Gods Must Be Crazy II" was also a hit, both movies making Namibian actor Nǃxau ǂToma a well known movie star, while 1991's "Crazy Safari" is the first of three unofficial sequels which were made by a Hong Kong based film company named Orange Sky Golden Harvest, also starring Nǃxau ǂToma. The two latter others, "Crazy in Hong Kong" (1993) and "The Gods Must Be Funny In China" (1995) were not filmed in Botswana.

2000's Disney production "Whispers: An Elephant's Tale" was filmed in Botswana, starring Hollywood legend Angela Bassett. Later on, during 2009, parts of M. Saravanan's Tamil language Indian action film, "Ayan" were recorded in Botswana.

The No. 1 Ladies' Detective Agency was shot on location in Botswana starting in 2007. It was the first major production to be filmed in Botswana, and the government provided five million dollars of funding for the project. 

The critically acclaimed "A United Kingdom", about the real-life love story of Seretse Khama and Ruth Williams, was filmed partly between Botswana and London, England and was released internationally in 2016.

Cinema companies
Botswana has a number of cinema and movie theater companies, including New Capitol Cinemas and Gaborone Cine Centre.

References

 
History of Botswana by topic